Alkali Lake is a geographic sink in Lake County, Oregon, United States. It is in the Alkali Subbasin of the Summer Lake Basin watershed in southeastern Oregon, located 26 miles east of Christmas Valley, Oregon, northeast of Lake Abert, to the immediate west of Abert Rim and Highway 395.

Since then, its water level has varied, with a drying trend.
Notable features include dissolved alkaline salts averaging 10% of total brine weight in its seasonal waters and a nearby chemical disaster, Alkali Lake Chemical Waste Dump.

Plants
Plants known to occur in the dunes immediately north of the lake include:
Buckwheat Family
Broom Buckwheat
Goosefoot Family
Spiny Hopsage
Mustard Family
Stanleya or Guillenia sp.
Evening-primrose family
Desert Evening-primrose
Parsley Family
Rhysopterus plurijugus
Phlox Family
Great Basin Gilia
Borage Family
Matted Cryptantha
Sunflower Family
Desert Pincushion
Gray Rabbitbrush
Showy Townsend Daisy

Climate
According to the Köppen Climate Classification system, Alkali Lake has a steppe climate, abbreviated "BSk" on climate maps.

See also
Alkali Lake State Airport

References

Works cited
 McArthur, Lewis A. Oregon Geographic Names, Fourth ed. 1974. Edwards Brothers. Ann Arbor, MI
 U.S. Fish and Wildlife Service, Oregon Field Office

Lakes of Oregon
Lakes of Lake County, Oregon
Endorheic lakes of Oregon